King's Highway 24, commonly referred to as Highway 24, is a highway in the Canadian province of Ontario that currently begins at Highway 3 in Simcoe, and ends at the southern city limits of Cambridge. The south–north route travels through Brantford, as well as the community of Scotland. Outside of those communities, Highway24 travels through a predominantly agricultural area.

Highway24 was established in 1927 between Simcoe and Guelph. Between 1936 and 1938, it was extended northeast to Collingwood, as well as south from Simcoe to Port Dover. Much of the section of highway between Caledon Village and Collingwood followed Hurontario Street, with the section of that historic route from Orangeville and Glen Huron being bypassed. Construction of a new route between Simcoe and Brantford took place in the mid-1960s, bypassing the town of Waterford.

In 1997 and 1998, the majority of Highway24 – both south of Simcoe, as well as north of and through Cambridge – was transferred to the responsibility of the various counties and regions through which it travelled. The former sections of the route are now known as Norfolk County Road24, Waterloo Regional Road24, Peel Regional Road24, and County Road124 in Wellington, Dufferin, Grey and Simcoe Counties.

Route description 

Highway24 begins at Highway3 in the town of Simcoe. The highway once continued south, but this has since been transferred to local jurisdiction and is now Norfolk County Highway24.
North of the town, Highway24 travels in a straight line northward through Norfolk County, with farmland dominating the surroundings. As the highway approaches the community of Scotland, it enters Brant County. It turns northeast and bypasses to the east of the community, then meanders through thick forests for several kilometres. It returns to farmland and curves northward before intersecting former Highway 53 (Colborne Street West) near Brantford Municipal Airport.

A short distance north of former Highway53, which is now known as Brant County Highway53, Highway24 encounters an interchange with Highway403 (Exit27) south of Paris. Highway24 splits from Highway403 to resume its northward orientation at the King George Road interchange (Exit36).
Between Brantford and Cambridge, Highway24 is a busy two lane rural highway that has played host to frequent collisions, prompting a Ministry of Transportation of Ontario (MTO) investigation into possible upgrades to the stretch.

Highway24 is generally straight and flat as it progresses north through the agricultural countryside of Brant County, but suddenly drops into the Grand River Valley as it enters the Regional Municipality of Waterloo. It follows the river along its eastern bank towards Cambridge, ending at the southern city limits.
Within Wellington, Dufferin, Grey and Simcoe counties, the former route of Highway24 is now designated as County Road124, while in Waterloo and Peel Regions the route is designated Regional Road24. Within Wellington County, there is also an unrelated County Road24.

History 

Highway24 was first designated on July2, 1927, when the Department of Highways (DHO) assumed the road between Highway3 at Simcoe and Highway 2 in Brantford, as well as the road connecting Highway2 in Paris with Highway 6 in Guelph, via Galt (Cambridge), as a new provincial highway. In addition, a concurrency was established with Highway2 between Brantford and Paris.
Highway24 originally entered Brantford along Mount Pleasant Street, before turning northeast onto Oxford Street (renamed Colborne Street West circa 1947), thence northwest concurrently with Highway2 (Brant Avenue / Paris Road) to Paris. At Church Street in Paris, it branched from Highway2 north along Dumfries Street and then Grand River Street towards Cambridge.
On June4, 1930 a more direct routing between Brantford and Cambridge was established; the route between Paris and Cambridge was renumbered as Highway24A.
As a result, the concurrency between Highway2 and Highway24 was reduced, with Highway24 now departing Highway2 in Brantford, along St. Paul Avenue and King George Road.

On September9, 1936, the highway was extended south from Simcoe to Lake Erie then east to Highway6 in Port Dover. This was followed several months later by an extension from Guelph through Erin to the Wellington–Peel county boundary, which was assumed on March31, 1937.
On August11, 1937, the DHO designated the Shelburne to Collingwood Road as Highway24.
The highway turned east at Singhampton and continued to near Glen Huron, where it curved back north to rejoin Hurontario until its terminus in Collingwood. This left a large gap in the highway, including the terminus near Erin that did not end at a provincial highway. This was remedied eight months later when the DHO assumed several county roads in Peel County (now the Regional Municipality of Peel) on April13, 1938. This established Highway24 between the county boundary and Orangeville, via Alton, as well as Highway 51 between Highway 10 in Caledon Village and Coulterville.
In addition, Highway10 and Highway24 were signed concurrently between Orangeville and Shelburne.
By 1963, the segment of Highway24 through Alton was redesignated as Highway 136, as Highway24 was re-routed along a redesignated Highway51 towards Highway10 in that year.

Construction of a new route for Highway24 between Simcoe and Brantford began on October9, 1963.
While originally intended to be an extension of Highway24A between Simcoe and Paris,
it would instead serve as a rerouting of Highway24 upon completion as far north as the Highway53 junction south of Paris by 1968.
In 1970, the southern terminus of Highway24 was rerouted southwest to end at Highway59 near Walsingham, with Highway6 absorbing the short length west of Port Dover to Halfway House Corners.

As part of a series of budget cuts initiated by premier Mike Harris under his Common Sense Revolution platform in 1995, numerous highways deemed to no longer be of significance to the provincial network were decommissioned and responsibility for the routes transferred to a lower level of government, a process referred to as downloading. Portions of Highway24 were consequently transferred to local jurisdictions in 1997 and 1998. On April1, 1997, the southernmost section, between Highway59 and Highway3 at Simcoe, was transferred to Norfolk County.
On January1, 1998, the section north of Cambridge, through Waterloo and onward to Collingwood, was transferred to the various counties and regions through which it travelled.

Major intersections

Suffixed routes

Highway 24A 

Highway24A was the original route of Highway24 within what is now Brant County. The route travelled north from Paris to just north of the South Dumfries–North Dumfries boundary, ending at the southern edge of the Bannister Lake Complex in Waterloo Region.
While Highway24 was rerouted to the east on June4, 1930, the Highway24A designation did not become official until 1933, with two forks of Highway24 existing prior to then.
Following the formation of the Regional Municipality of Waterloo in the mid-1970s, the portion of Highway24A north of the regional boundary was decommissioned, becoming Waterloo Regional Road75.
The route remained unchanged until April1, 1997, when it was transferred in its entirety to Brant County. It is now known as Brant County Highway24A.

See also
Hurontario Street

References

External links 
Highway 24 expansion
Highway 24 Corridor Planning and Class EA Study, accessed December 3, 2006
Legislative Assembly of Ontario: Highway 24, June 15, 2006, question by MPP Dave Levac (Brant), answered by Minister of Transportation Donna Cansfield, accessed 9 October 2007

024
Roads in Norfolk County, Ontario